The Auburn–UAB men's basketball rivalry is a men's college basketball rivalry between the Auburn Tigers and the UAB Blazers. Despite its relative youth and a 15-year hiatus from 2000–2014, the rivalry remains one of the fiercest and most competitive in the state of Alabama.

History

Formation and early games 
Auburn and UAB first played in 1982, just four seasons after the creation of the UAB men's basketball program. The matchup originated as a supplementary event at the Birmingham–Jefferson Civic Center (BJCC) for Auburn fans in Birmingham on the night before the Iron Bowl football game was played at Legion Field. However, UAB's quick rise to national prominence led to the Auburn–UAB game gaining significance in its own right. Three of those first five games in the BJCC saw one of the two teams come in ranked in the top 25, and the 1984 game remains the third-largest home crowd in UAB basketball history.

Following a one-year break, Auburn and UAB played each other for 12 consecutive seasons. UAB was dominant during this period, winning eight out of ten games from 1989–1997. The 1997 and 1998 editions of the rivalry were played in the Holiday Hardwood Classic at the BJCC as part of a doubleheader with Alabama.

Hiatus
Following their 1999 matchup, Auburn head coach Cliff Ellis wanted the series to be played at Auburn until the number of games played in Auburn was equal to those played in Birmingham. UAB athletic director Gene Bartow and UAB head coach Murry Bartow refused to play the game exclusively in Auburn, so the series came to a halt. Despite pleas from both the media and the fans to continue the rivalry, no games were scheduled between the two programs for 15 seasons.

Rivalry renewal 
In May 2015, following UAB's NCAA tournament upset over 3-seed Iowa State and Bruce Pearl's first season at Auburn, UAB announced that they had reached an agreement to play Auburn in a four-game series. The first game would be played at Auburn, the second at UAB, then back at Auburn, then finally at Legacy Arena. (formerly the BJCC) Auburn won the first game of the series renewal in front of a sold out Auburn Arena, 75–74, on a 3-pointer in the final seconds of the game. In 2016, Auburn defeated UAB in the first game played at Bartow Arena in the series since 1996, 74–70. Auburn lead the entire game in a 85–80 victory to tie the series at 10 games apiece in 2017. Carrying a #8 ranking into the 2018 matchup, Auburn managed to survive a scare from UAB in overtime at Legacy Arena, 75–71, completing the series sweep against the Blazers. Auburn and UAB have not met since.

Game results

References

College basketball rivalries in the United States
Auburn Tigers men's basketball
UAB Blazers men's basketball